Denza is a automotive joint venture by BYD and Mercedes-Benz.

Denza may also refer to:

 Denza (musician) (born 1993), the stage name of the Dutch music producer Dimitri van Bronswijk
 Ciro Denza (1844–1915), Italian painter
 Francesco Denza (1934–1894), Italian meteorologist
 Luigi Denza (1846–1922), Italian composer

See also
 Danza (disambiguation)